{{Infobox rail
|name           = Greater Anglia
|bgcolor        =
|logo_filename  = AbellioEastAnglia.svg
|image_filename = File:Greater_Anglia_745010_Colchester.jpg
|image_size     = 300
|caption        = Class 745 at Colchester in February 2020
|franchise      = Greater Anglia5 February 2012 – 15 October 2016East Anglia16 October 2016 – 20 September 2026
|nameforarea    = region
|regions        = Cambridgeshire, Essex, Norfolk & Suffolk
|secregions     = London & Hertfordshire
|fleet          = 
{{plainlist|
14  units<ref name="TRUK254">

Greater Anglia (legal name Abellio East Anglia Limited) is a train operating company in Great Britain owned as a joint venture by Transport UK Group and Mitsui & Co. It operates the East Anglia franchise, providing the commuter and intercity services from its Central London terminus at London Liverpool Street to Essex, Suffolk, Norfolk and parts of Hertfordshire and Cambridgeshire as well as many regional services throughout the East of England.

Abellio began operating the franchise, then known as the Greater Anglia franchise, in February 2012. Initially, it traded under the same name until it rebranded as Abellio Greater Anglia in December 2013. Shortly after taking over operations, the company initiated a series of projects to improve service levels, including the procurement of new trains and the launch of the 'Norwich in 90' programme to reduce travel times between several major locations on its network. In May 2015, Greater Anglia's stopping metro services were transferred to London Overground and the precursor to Crossrail, TfL Rail.

The franchise was re-tendered as the East Anglia franchise, and awarded to Abellio in August 2016. The company resumed trading as Greater Anglia on 16 October 2016 when the new franchise commenced. In January 2017, Abellio announced that subject to gaining Department for Transport approval, it had agreed to sell a 40% stake in the business to Mitsui. Since the completion of the sale in March 2017, Greater Anglia has incorporated several Japanese planning tools and practices. Trade unions have objected to some of the changes made by the company, leading to industrial action in 2017 and 2018 as a result of the dispute.

History

Background

In December 2003, the Strategic Rail Authority awarded the Greater Anglia franchise to National Express, which began operations on 1 April 2004, initially under the brand-name One. The franchise was to run until March 2011, with provision for a three-year extension if performance targets were met. In November 2009, the Department for Transport (DfT) announced that National Express would not be granted the three-year extension even though it had met the performance criteria, because National Express East Coast had defaulted on the InterCity East Coast franchise.

Following a change of government as a result of  the 2010 general election, the DfT announced in June 2010 that all refranchising would be put on hold while a process review was conducted. As a result, National Express East Anglia was granted an initial extension until October 2011, followed by another until February 2012.

In March 2011, the DfT announced that Abellio, Go-Ahead, and Stagecoach had been shortlisted to bid for the franchise. In October 2011, the new franchise was awarded to Abellio; accordingly, the services previously operated by National Express East Anglia were transferred to Greater Anglia on 5 February 2012.

The Greater Anglia franchise was originally to run until July 2014; the reason for awarding a short franchise at a time when the government was speaking of its desire for longer franchises was to allow the government to digest the recommendations of the McNulty Rail Value for Money study before letting a long-term franchise. In March 2013, the Secretary of State for Transport announced the franchise would again be extended until 15 October 2016. Greater Anglia was rebranded as Abellio Greater Anglia in December 2013.

Changes
Prior to Greater Anglia, the last period of substantial investment in the region had been nearly 30 years earlier, specifically the electrification of the line north of Ipswich. At the commencement of the franchise, railway commentator Philip Haigh observed that the region's services had changed little since the BR days, and that change was overdue. During the negotiations for the award of the franchise, Greater Anglia pledged to undertake numerous investments that would improve the various services and facilities offered. On 4 November 2014, the Great Eastern Main Line Taskforce released its investment analysis report, which included a detailed breakdown of several proposed investments in the region's rail network.

One major initiative that was commenced by Greater Anglia shortly after it took over operations was the 'Norwich in 90' campaign, aimed at introducing faster journey times, such as between London and Colchester within 40 minutes, London and Ipswich in 60 minutes, and London and Norwich in 90 minutes. Several organisations, including Norfolk County Council, had been calling for such a scheme to be undertaken since as early as 2009. Abellio had acknowledged such calls in 2012, but could not justify making very substantial investments during the initial franchise period due to the short timescale involved. The creation of the Great Eastern Rail Taskforce in 2013 was seen as a major step towards this. In 2015, Chloe Smith, Norwich North MP and co-chairman of the taskforce, noted that the scheme was as much a political effort as it was an engineering one.

By the 2010s, the region's rail infrastructure was relatively worn-out and prone to unreliability. Modernisation efforts would therefore focus not only on improving absolute speeds but on reducing failure rates as well. This work is being undertaken as a multiagency effort, involving not only infrastructure changes carried out by Network Rail and various civil engineering companies, but also the procurement of new rolling stock and other efforts. It was recognised early on that, for the intercity services to be meaningfully speeded up, slower regional trains could not feasibly be overtaken or avoided on the mostly twin-track line, so that services overall would need to be accelerated. There has also been an aspiration to increase the number of trains between Norwich and London to three per hour, although capacity constraints such as the single-track section in the vicinity of the Trowse Swing Bridge would need to be overcome to facilitate this.

Some services have been transferred from Greater Anglia's management to other rail operators. On 31 May 2015, the Liverpool Street to Enfield Town, Cheshunt (via Seven Sisters) and Chingford services, as well as the Romford to Upminster service, were transferred to London Overground Rail Operations. On the same day, the Liverpool Street to Shenfield stopping services were also transferred to the TfL Rail concession managed by MTR.

In June 2015, an Abellio (60%) / Stagecoach (40%) joint venture, FirstGroup and National Express were shortlisted to bid for the franchise. In December 2015, it was announced that Stagecoach had pulled out of the joint bid with Abellio, and that Abellio would continue the bid alone. In August 2016, it was announced that Abellio had successfully retained the franchise until 2025. One commitment of the new franchise period is the purchase of 1,043 new carriages, 660 from Bombardier Transportation's Derby Litchurch Lane Works with the remainder being built by Stadler Rail. In January 2017, Abellio announced that, subject to gaining DfT approval, it had agreed to sell a 40% stake in the business to Mitsui. The sale was completed in March 2017. Reportedly, Greater Anglia has incorporated numerous planning and operational practices of the Japanese railways, such as the use of digital twin simulation software for analysing performance and developing its timetables, since the acquisition.

In 2021, following the COVID-19 emergency measures, Greater Anglia was given a direct award contract, replacing its franchise agreement, expiring on 20 September 2026.

In February 2023, Transport UK Group concluded a management buyout of Abellio's United Kingdom business, which included its share in Greater Anglia.

Industrial action
In August 2017, amidst a background of ongoing rail strikes on a national level, Greater Anglia conductors voted in favour of going on strike in a dispute over planned ticket office closures and the planned introduction of more widespread driver-only operation on the Greater Anglia network. On numerous occasions since October 2017, industrial action has been taken by portions of the company's employees, and the principal matter of dispute has seen no effective resolution. The National Union of Rail, Maritime and Transport Workers (RMT) has accused Greater Anglia of conducting alleged strike-breaking tactics and claimed that its use of stand-in conductors led to passengers' safety being jeopardised. The dispute between Greater Anglia and the RMT continued into 2018, with further strikes threatened during the summer that affected around 40 percent of the operator's services.

On 19 July 2018, the RMT announced members had voted 9 to 1 to accept a deal that would keep guards on trains, and halted the expansion of driver only operation.

Greater Anglia is one of several train operators impacted by the 2022–2023 United Kingdom railway strikes, which are the first national rail strikes in the UK for three decades. Its workers are amongst those who are participating in industrial action due to a dispute over pay and working conditions.

Franchise commitments

Greater Anglia franchise (2012–2016)

A number of improvements were planned during the first franchise period (20122016) which included:
 Improved station and ticket facilities and better information for passengers;
 A text messaging service to keep passengers informed of any disruptions;
 Extending Oyster card pay-as-you-go capabilities between London Liverpool Street and Shenfield / Hertford East;
 Mobile-phone and print-at-home ticketing facilities;
 600 extra car park spaces at stations;
 Additional bicycle storage facilities;
 New automatic ticket barriers at Brentwood (no automatic ticket barrier was installed by Abellio Greater Anglia and management of the station later passed to TfL Rail).

East Anglia franchise (2016–2025)

The following improvements have been planned as part of the Abellio bid for the East Anglia franchise (20162025):
 Replacement of the entire current fleet, with 1,043 new vehicles by September 2020 to run on the Regional, Intercity, Dutchflyer, Stansted Express, West Anglia and Great Eastern routes:
 Extensive refurbishment of some of the existing vehicles, prior to replacement;
 Raise Public Performance Measure scores to at least 92.9%;
 Two weekday trains operating between Norwich and Ipswich to London with a journey time of 90 min and 60 min respectively;
 Free wifi on trains and stations;
 £60 million investment for station upgrades, with a focus on Broxbourne, Cambridge, Cheshunt, Harlow Town and Southend Victoria stations;
 Introduction of digital information screens on all stations, with improvements in car and cycle parking (1,800 and 4,000 extra spaces respectively) along with upgrades to ticket offices and vending machines;
 New ticketing programmes, with offers for infrequent travellers and part-time workers;
 Introduction of an automatic Delay Repay service for season and advance ticket holders;
 £120 million of investment into depots with a new maintenance facility at Manningtree;
 Hiring of twenty trainees per year and creation of at least thirty apprenticeships by 2019;
 Extension of the Gainsborough Line from Marks Tey to Colchester Town;
 Reintroduction of four direct Lowestoft to London services on the East Suffolk Line;
 Improving the frequency of the Ipswich to Ely Line services to Peterborough from every two hours to hourly with some additional services extending to Colchester;
 Improving the frequency of the Ipswich to Cambridge Line and East Suffolk Line services from every two hours to hourly respectively on Sundays.

Services
, the following services operate during the off-peak period, Monday to Friday (request stops not included):

Stansted Express
Greater Anglia operates the Stansted Express sub-branded airport rail link between Stansted Airport, London Liverpool Street and Stratford. , Stansted Express' off-peak services Monday to Friday is:

Performance

Punctuality statistics released by Network Rail for service report period 7 of 20132014 (15 September  13 October 2013) were 94.0% PPM (Public Performance Measure), down 1.0 percentage point on the same period ine the previous year, and the MAA (Moving Annual Average) up to 12 October 2013 also fell slightly to 92.3%. In 2013, Abellio Greater Anglia was named train operator of the year.
However, a survey in February 2014 by the consumer group Which? found that customer satisfaction with Abellio Greater Anglia was at last place (out of 20 train operators) with a satisfaction percentage of 40%, and in 2016 Abellio Greater Anglia was rated the fourth worst UK train operator with a commuter rail services satisfaction rating of 35%.

Forecasts issued during the mid-2010s predicted that demand on the GEML into London from Suffolk and Norfolk was expected to grow by 32 percent, while demand from Essex was to go up by 52 percent. This prediction was in spite of the relatively low levels of subsidies provided for Greater Anglia's operations, and the general lack of improvements in prior years; according to industry periodical Rail, it was the second least subsidised passenger operator by 2015.

Rolling stock

Due to its short initial franchise term, Greater Anglia was not planning to introduce any new trains, although this policy changed substantially following the start of its second franchise term in October 2016.

In November 2013, an online petition was launched, aimed at stopping Greater Anglia's trains from dumping raw sewage from the train toilets directly onto the tracks. There were also concerns with the 'sewage mist' from passing trains making Network Rail staff ill, and Greater Anglia announced it was "working closely" with the government to introduce a fleet upgrade. By October 2016, all the franchise's Mark 3 carriages and Class 156 multiple units had been refitted with controlled emission toilets.

On 31 May 2015, the company's fleet of Class 315 trains were cascaded to London Overground and TfL Rail, and some Class 317 trains have been cascaded to London Overground, which has taken over local services in North and East London from the Greater Anglia franchise.

In August 2016, it was announced 1,043 new carriages would be purchased, which will allow for all of the ageing stock to be replaced, especially necessary given that a number of coaches are not compliant with accessibility requirements beyond 2020 and they would not be able to meet Abellio's new targets for lower journey times without extensive modification. One part of the contract went to Bombardier with nearly £1 billion to build 111 Bombardier Aventra electric multiple units and the other part of the purchase went to Stadler to build 58 FLIRT electric multiple units, all of which would enter service between August 2019 and September 2020.

Bombardier's order included all 111 Class 720 units for taking over local and commuter services out of Liverpool Street. Stadler's order included 20 twelve-carriage Class 745 units for taking over intercity services on the Great Eastern Main Line and the Stansted Express as well as 38 three- and four-carriage Class 755 units for taking over all local diesel services from the previous outdated rolling stock. By July 2020, all Class 755 trains have entered passenger service.

The first unit of the new order to enter service was the Class 755 fleet, of which the first one entered service on 29 July 2019 on the Norwich to Great Yarmouth and Lowestoft route. The next of the order was the Class 745/0 fleet, of which the first one entered service on 8 January 2020 on the Great Eastern Main Line operating services between Norwich and Liverpool Street. Following the introduction of these units, the loco-hauled Class 90 sets have all been withdrawn from service, with the last set running its last services on 24 March 2020.

In March 2020, testing of the new Class 720 fleet finally began and is continuing to be done despite the ongoing COVID-19 pandemic in order to allow the first unit to enter service within the next few months. In June 2020, the units were authorised to enter passenger service and after further testing and crew training, the first two units finally entered service on 26 November 2020 as a pairing on the Shenfield to Southend Line.

Beginning in June 2020, Class 360s began moving to Kings Heath TMD, Northampton for modifications by Siemens to make them 110 mph in preparation for their transfer to East Midlands Railway. Due to delays in commissioning the Class 720s and to allow the Class 360s to be released, three Class 321/9s and five Class 322s, last used by Northern Trains were leased from July 2020. The first unit bound for East Midlands Railway, 360120, moved to Cricklewood Depot on 10 November 2020, with all having transferred to EMR by February 2021.

Due to high leasing costs the fleet of 30 Class 379 Electrostar EMUs was withdrawn and sent to storage in February 2022.

On 1 August 2022, Greater Anglia confirmed that all West Anglia Services are operated by Class 720 Aventra units.

Current fleet

Past fleet
Former train types operated by Greater Anglia include:

Depots
Greater Anglia's fleet is maintained at Clacton-on-Sea, Ilford and Crown Point depots.

Notes

References

External links

British companies established in 2012
Mitsui & Co.
Nederlandse Spoorwegen
Railway companies established in 2012
Railway operators in London
Train operating companies in the United Kingdom
2012 establishments in England